Harambee is an East African tradition of community self-help events, and is also the official motto of Kenya.

Harambee may also refer to:

 Harambee (African-American newspaper), a publication of the Los Angeles Black Congress
 Harambee, a predominantly African-American neighborhood in Milwaukee, Wisconsin
 "Harambee", a popular Kenyan song by Daudi Kabaka
 "Harambee", a reggae song by Rita Marley
 Harambee Park, a park in Boston, Massachusetts
 Harambee House, office of the President of Kenya in Nairobi
 Harambee Stars, nickname for the Kenya national football team
 MV Harambee, a German-built ship in service between 1953 and 1980
 Harambee Youth Employment Accelerator, which assists first-time job seekers in South Africa

See also
 Harambe (disambiguation)